Karin Sander (born 1957 in Bensberg, North Rhine-Westphalia) is a German conceptual artist. She lives and works in Berlin and Zurich.

Life 

Karin Sander studied at the Freie Kunstschule Stuttgart and at the Staatliche Akademie der Bildenden Künste Stuttgart with Jürgen Brodwolf and others. In 1989–1990, she received a scholarship from the German Academic Exchange Service (DAAD-scholarship) for New York, where she attended the Independent Study Program (ISP) of the Whitney Museum of American Art. Karin Sander has been invited to guest professorships at the Iceland University of Arts, Reykjavík (Listaháskóli Íslands, 1993), the CalArts (California Institute of the Arts, Los Angeles), 1995), the Akademie der Bildenden Künste in Karlsruhe (1995–1996), the Staatliche Akademie der Bildenden Künste Stuttgart (1997–1998) and the Elam School of Fine Arts, Auckland (2003). From 1999 to 2007, she was professor at the Kunsthochschule Berlin-Weissensee and since 2007, she holds the chair for architecture and art at the ETH Zurich Swiss Federal Institute of Technology.

Karin Sander is a member of Deutscher Künstlerbund (Association of German Artists), in 2007, she was elected to the Akademie der Künste (Academy of Arts) Berlin. Her work has been exhibited worldwide, particularly in Europe and the United States, notably in solo exhibitions at Museion, Bozen (2020), Kunst Museum Winterthur (2018), the Neuer Berliner Kunstverein (2011), Kunstmuseum St. Gallen (2010), K20 Kunstsammlung North Rhine-Westphalia, Düsseldorf (2010), Temporäre Kunsthalle, Berlin (2009), Kunstverein Arnsberg (2008).

Since November 2021, Sander has been director of the fine arts section there.

Works 

In her exhibitions Karin Sander refers to existing situations and addresses their institutional and historical context. With her mostly site-specific interventions, she intervenes in the structures of institutions, changes them, highlights facts and invites participation. The seemingly familiar is rethought, it becomes the starting point of an exploratory process. She uses various media, including painting, sculpture, drawing, electronic media, film and photography.

Her Mailed Paintings (begun in 2004), for example, standard-sized and primed canvases of various shapes, are sent to exhibitions without any kind of protection; while being on display constantly, they collect and display traces and marks of their journey.

 Astro Turf Floorpiece (Kunstrasen), The Museum of Modern Art, New York, 1994
 Hühnerei, poliert, roh, Größe 0 / Chicken Egg, Polished, Raw, Size 0, in „Leiblicher Logos“, Wanderausstellung des ifa (Institut für Auslandsbeziehungen), 1995–2002
 Personen 1:10 / Persons 1:10, 3-D-Bodyscans der lebenden Personen, Galerie Helga de Alvear, Madrid, 2000
 Museumsbesucher 1:9 / Museum Visitors 1:9, 3-D-Bodyscans der lebenden Personen, Staatsgalerie Stuttgart, 2002
 Wordsearch, a translinguistic sculpture, 4. Oktober 2002, New York Times, in Zusammenarbeit mit der Kunstreihe „Moment“ der Deutschen Bank, 2002
 Polished Wallpiece, in „Singular Forms (Sometimes Repeated)“ Solomon R. Guggenheim Museum New York, 2004
 Gebrauchsbilder / Mailed Paintings, D’Amelio Terras Gallery, New York, 2007
 XML-SVG Code, Quellcode des Ausstellungsraumes / XML-SVG Code, Source Code of the Exhibition Space, Galerie Nächst St. Stephan, Wien, 2009
 Zeigen. Eine Audiotour durch Berlin, Temporäre Kunsthalle Berlin, 2009–2010

Works in Public Collections (selected) 
Sander's work is in the collection of the Museum of Modern Art,  the Metropolitan Museum of Art, the San Francisco Museum of Modern Art, and the National Gallery of Canada.

References

Bibliography 
Monography

 Karin Sander. Skulptur / Sculpture / Scultura, ed. Letizia Ragaglia, Museion, Bozen; Köln: Verlag der Buchhandlung Walther König, 2020, 
 Karin Sander. A–Z., Haus am Waldsee, Berlin; Köln: Verlag der Buchhandlung Walther König, 2019, 
 Randomly Selected Works. Karin Sander, ed. Nikolai Kunsthal Copenhagen; Akademie der Künste, Berlin, Copenhagen 2016
 Karin Sander. Museumsbesucher 1:8, ed. Marion Ackermann, Kunstsammlung Nordrhein-Westfalen, Düsseldorf and Raimund Stecker, Lehmbruck-Museum, Duisburg, Köln: Walther König, 2013, 
 Karin Sander. Ausstellungskatalog / Exhibition Catalogue, ed. Marius Babias, Neuer Berliner Kunstverein, Berlin; Köln: Verlag der Buchhandlung Walther König, 2012, 
 Karin Sander. Gebrauchsbilder, ed. Staatliche Kunsthalle Baden-Baden und Kunstmuseum St. Gallen, Nürnberg: Verlag für moderne Kunst, 2011, 
 Zeigen. Eine Audiotour durch Berlin von Karin Sander, Temporäre Kunsthalle Berlin; Köln: Verlag der Buchhandlung Walther König, 2010
 Karin Sander. XML-SVG CODE – Quellcode / Source Code, ed. Förderverein Museum gegenstandsfreier Kunst e.V. Otterndorf, 2010
 Karin Sander, ed. von Gudrun Inboden, Staatsgalerie Stuttgart; Ostfildern-Ruit: Hatje Cantz, 2002, 
 Karin Sander, Kunstmuseum St. Gallen; Ostfildern-Ruit: Hatje Cantz, 1996, 

Articles and Interviews

 Benjamin Paul, „Trace Value“, in: Artforum , 56, No. 8, April 2018, p. 137–143
 Hans Ulrich Obrist (ed.), Interview Marathon Stuttgart 24./25. Juni 2005 , Stuttgart: Institut für Buchgestaltung und Medienentwicklung an der Staatlichen Akademie der Bildenden Künste Stuttgart, 2006, p. 123–126
 Oliver Koerner von Gustorf, „Counting Water, Collecting Words“, in: The New York Times Magazine , No. 6, 29. September 2002, p. 48–51
 Hans Ulrich Obrist, In Conversation with Karin Sander, in: The New York Times Magazine , No. 6, September 29, 2002, p. 18–44
 Roberta Smith, „Karin Sander“, in: The New York Times, May 5, 2000

External links 
 
  ETH Zurich

1957 births
Living people
German conceptual artists
German contemporary artists
Women conceptual artists
20th-century German women artists
21st-century German women artists